Australian pioneers may refer to:

Settlers of Australia 

 Settlers of Australia

Military

World War I - First Australian Imperial Force 
 1st Pioneer Battalion (New South Wales), 1st Division
 2nd Pioneer Battalion (Western Australia), 2nd Division
 3rd Pioneer Battalion (Victoria, Queensland, South Australia, Western Australia), 3rd Division
 4th Pioneer Battalion (Queensland), 4th Division
 5th Pioneer Battalion (South Australia), 5th Division

World War II - Second Australian Imperial Force 

 2/1st Pioneer Battalion (Australia)
 2/2nd Pioneer Battalion (Australia)
 2/3rd Pioneer Battalion (Australia)
 2/4th Pioneer Battalion (Australia)

Military units and formations disambiguation pages